The Only Game in Town may refer to:
 Only Game in Town, a 1992 album by The Warratahs
 The Only Game in Town (El-Erian book), 2016 economics book by Mohamed A. El-Erian
 The Only Game in Town (film), 1970 drama film
 The Only Game in Town (novel), 1988 novel by John Bibee
 The Only Game in Town (play), 1968 play by Frank D. Gilroy